Scolichthys iota is a species of poeciliid found in the dense vegetation along the Rio Chajmaic in Alta Verapaz, Guatemala. It is found along with Xiphophorus signum.

References

Wischnath, L., 1993. Atlas of livebearers of the world. T.F.H. Publications, Inc., United States of America. 336 p.

Poeciliidae
Fish of Guatemala
Taxa named by Donn Eric Rosen
Fish described in 1967